Surojana Sethabutra (born 1956, in Bangkok) is a Thai ceramic artist.  An MFA from Kansas State University, Surojana's work tries to break the traditional mold of Thai ceramics into new forms.  She specializes in hand building.  She is a prominent member of Womanifesto, an international woman's art exchange.

Surojana is married to a Thai architect, and has one daughter, Som-O, who is currently studying medicine at Siriraj Hospital.

External links
Interview with Surojana
Description of Surojana's work

Surojana Sethabutra
1956 births
Living people